Zirconium(IV) fluoride (ZrF4) is an inorganic chemical compound. It is a component of ZBLAN fluoride glass. It is insoluble in water. It is the main component of fluorozirconate glasses.

Three crystalline phases of ZrF4 have been reported, α (monoclinic), β (tetragonal, Pearson symbol tP40, space group P42/m, No 84) and γ (unknown structure). β and γ phases are unstable and irreversibly transform into the α phase at 400 °C.

Zirconium fluoride is used as a zirconium source in oxygen-sensitive applications, e.g. metal production. Zirconium fluoride can be purified by distillation or sublimation.

Conditions/substances to avoid are: moisture, active metals, acids and oxidizing agents.

Zirconium fluoride in a mixture with other fluorides is a coolant for molten salt reactors. In the mixture with sodium fluoride it is a candidate coolant for the Advanced High-Temperature Reactor.

Together with uranium salt, zirconium fluoride can be a component of fuel-coolant in molten salt reactors.  Mixture of sodium fluoride, zirconium fluoride, and uranium tetrafluoride (53-41-6 mol.%) was used as a coolant in the Aircraft Reactor Experiment. A mixture of lithium fluoride, beryllium fluoride, zirconium fluoride, and uranium-233 tetrafluoride was used in the Molten-Salt Reactor Experiment. (Uranium-233 is used in the thorium fuel cycle reactors.)

References

 ORNL/TM-2006/12 Assessment of Candidate Molten Salt Coolants for the Advanced High-Temperature Reactor (AHTR), March 2006 (Accessed 2008/9/18)

Fluorides
Zirconium(IV) compounds
Metal halides